Bjork on MTV: Unplugged & Live is an official DVD released by Björk on 9 February 2002. It features two complete MTV performances: the first show was recorded on MTV Unplugged in 1994 during the promotion of her album Debut and the second show was recorded on MTV Live in 1998 for the promotion of her album Homogenic. A cover of the track "My Funny Valentine" was performed on the MTV Unplugged performance but is not included on this DVD.

Fans were disappointed to find that both shows appear on the DVD as originally broadcast, with tracks cut short to fit into the syndicated slot. However, a fuller audio version of the MTV Unplugged performance appears on Debut Live, first released as part of the Live Box set in 2003 and later released separately in 2004. The DVD was re-released in 2003 to fix synchronisation problems, and to change the audio from mono to stereo on the MTV Unplugged part.

Track listing

References

Björk video albums
Mtv Unplugged Live
Live video albums
2002 video albums
2002 live albums